Juhan Parts' cabinet was in office in Estonia from 10 April 2003 to 13 April 2005, when it was succeeded by Andrus Ansip's first cabinet.

Members

This cabinet's members were the following:
 Juhan Parts – Prime Minister
 Margus Leivo – Minister of Interior Affairs
 Kristiina Ojuland – Minister of Foreign Affairs
 Ken-Marti Vaher – Minister of Justice
 Meelis Atonen – Minister of Economic Affairs and Communications

References

Cabinets of Estonia